Iano Simão da Silva Imbeni (born 2 February 1999) is a Bissau-Guinean football player. He plays for Spanish club Deportivo Fabril.

International career
He made his debut for Guinea-Bissau national football team on 15 November 2021 in a World Cup qualifier against Sudan.

References

External links
 
 
 

1999 births
Living people
Bissau-Guinean footballers
Guinea-Bissau international footballers
Association football forwards
A.D. Os Limianos players
C.D.C. Montalegre players
Deportivo Fabril players
Campeonato de Portugal (league) players
Tercera Federación players
Bissau-Guinean expatriate footballers
Expatriate footballers in Portugal
Bissau-Guinean expatriate sportspeople in Portugal
Expatriate footballers in Spain
Bissau-Guinean expatriate sportspeople in Spain